is a 2009 platform video game developed by Sonic Team and published by Sega as part of the Sonic the Hedgehog series. The game was released on the Wii as the second entry in the Sonic Storybook series, following Sonic and the Secret Rings (2007). Set in the world of King Arthur, the game combines Sonic's trademark speed with a new sword fighting system, utilizing the Wii Remote's motion-sensing functionality.

Sonic and the Black Knight received mixed reviews, with praise for its graphics, presentation and abundance of bonus content, but criticism of the game's controls, swordplay mechanics and multiplayer aspect. Sonic and the Black Knight was de-listed from retailers in 2010, following Sega's decision to remove all Sonic series titles with sub-average Metacritic scores in order to increase the value of the brand.

Gameplay

Gameplay differs from traditional games in the Sonic series by mixing in the new element of swordplay with the traditional Sonic platforming and speed. Swordplay is implemented through the Wii Remote. Gameplay is heavily inspired from Sonic and the Secret Rings with many of the same abilities and restrictions shared exclusively between the two games. Unlike other 3D Sonic games, Sonic cannot turn around, and is funneled into a set path automatically, only able to strafe left and right, move and backflip in reverse, or keep running forward. Unlike Sonic and the Secret Rings, however, Sonic's movement is controlled with the analog stick, making forward and backward movement more streamlined.

The stages feature townspeople that cheer the player on, and some that Sonic can interact with; these actions and the player's deeds will be judged at the end of each stage, updating his "knight ranking" accordingly. By interacting with these characters the player may do a quick-time button input. Doing so correctly will take away twenty of Sonic's rings and give them to the townsperson, and in return, he receives a gift at the end of the stage. In some stages, it is required to give a specific amount of rings to townspeople before reaching the goal. In stages where this is not required the townsperson will reward Sonic with an item. There are 242 items in the game, some of which can be gained by opening treasure chests in the stages. Any items collected during a stage must be identified at the end of the stage by using Sonic's "ID points". Rarer items cost more ID points than others. An online mode allows treasures to be traded between registered friends.

The game changes the traditional level items, such as springs and speed pads, into "fairies." These fairies come in varying colors; Yellow elements will be used as a group of one to twenty rings, Blue fairies will be used as speed boosts and springs, and Red will be used to fill the "Soul gauge." This gauge is filled by defeating enemies and collecting Red Fairies, and is used to unleash a powerful lock-on attack, Soul Surge. On only the first few stages, the "pearls" from the previous game, Sonic and the Secret Rings, appear as apples.

The skill system from Sonic and the Secret Rings also returns, but has been revised into a more standard linear progression system, Each playable character has three styles to choose from. At first, only the balanced "Knight" style is available, but later, "Cavalier" and "Paladin" styles are unlocked. They deal with the aspects of speed and power, respectively. As levels are completed, the player gains a number of "Followers" that is used as Experience and as the number of followers goes up, the number of skills the player has in a certain style are permanently increased. The "styles" of characters beside Sonic are not increased; Rather, their swords' abilities and skills are enhanced.

Once the "Knight's Quest" part of the story is reached, Sir Gawain (Knuckles the Echidna), Sir Lancelot (Shadow the Hedgehog), and Sir Percival (Blaze the Cat) will be playable from that point on. Each has their own characteristics; for instance, Knuckles wields dual swords that double as boomerangs and has the ability to glide, Blaze can surround herself with fire and use more lunge attacks than Sonic, and Shadow can use Chaos Powers. In story mode, they can use different swords than their own swords, unlike Sonic, who can only wield Caliburn.

Up to four players can play in the game's multiplayer, choosing between one of 12 characters to partake in a number of different kinds of battles. Characters include Sonic, Lancelot (Shadow), Gawain (Knuckles), Percival (Blaze), Blacksmith (Tails), Lady of the Lake (Amy Rose), Galahad (Silver the Hedgehog), Lamorak (Jet the Hawk), regular Shadow, regular Knuckles, regular Blaze and King Arthur.

Plot
A wizard named Merlina, granddaughter of Merlin, attempts to flee from a black knight and his forces. Cornered, she performs a spell calling forth a champion to save her, summoning Sonic the Hedgehog. As they retreat, Merlina explains to Sonic that the black knight is actually King Arthur, who has been corrupted by the immortality granted by Excalibur's scabbard, and that Sonic must defeat him to restore peace to the kingdom. With Sonic's speed alone being insufficient to defeat the King, he takes up the talking sword Caliburn.

At Caliburn's suggestion, Sonic meets up with the Lady of the Lake, Nimue (this world's version of Amy Rose), who tests Sonic to prove he is a worthy Knight. After completing her tasks, Nimue tells him that he must collect the sacred swords wielded by Lancelot, Gawain, and Percival of the Round Table (this world's versions of Shadow, Knuckles, and Blaze respectively) in order to dispel the immortality granted by Excalibur's scabbard. Defeating each of the Knights, Sonic claims all three swords and challenges the King once more, destroying him.

Sonic takes the scabbard back to Merlina, who reveals that there was never any King Arthur, and what he defeated was an illusion created by her grandfather Merlin, with Merlina manipulating Sonic in order to claim Excalibur's scabbard as her own. Merlina plans to use its power to make the kingdom changeless and eternal in hopes of averting the kingdom's fate from the legends. However, her plan is completely flawed, as such a world, going against the natural order of things, would not function properly, and it would come at the cost of innocent lives. She summons the underworld directly into the kingdom, creating the Dark Hollow and forcing Sonic and the Knights to flee. Nimue explains that the sacred swords can be used to form a barrier to prevent the Dark Hollow's spread, so Sonic and the Knights split up and journey to the kingdom's corners to form the barrier, but it proves to be too weak and the hollow continues to grow.

Sonic enters the Dark Hollow himself to confront Merlina, who has now become the Dark Queen, but she proves too powerful, destroying Caliburn and badly injuring Sonic. Seeing Sonic's continued resolve to stop the witch, Nimue and the Knights give Sonic the power of the sacred swords to restore Caliburn – now revealed to be the true Excalibur – and Sonic transforms into an armored super form called Excalibur Sonic. He defeats Merlina, destroying the Dark Hollow. After the battle, Sonic tells Merlina that, while everything has an end, people should live their lives to the fullest until that day comes. With King Arthur revealed as an illusion, the Knights of the Round Table prepare to disband, but Caliburn reminds them that he is the one who chooses the true king, now revealed to be Sonic.

In a post-credits cutscene, Sonic returns to his world and tells Amy about his adventures, but she believes it to be an excuse for missing their planned date. The game ends in a similar manner to Sonic and the Secret Rings, with the title of the book King Arthur and the Knights of the Round Table changing to Sonic and the Black Knight.

Development and release
Sonic and the Black Knight was first revealed at Nintendo's pre-Tokyo Game Show (TGS) 2008 press conference. Developer Sonic Team, a subsidiary of publisher Sega, decided to focus on combat and cinematic presentation for the game rather than the level design-oriented Sonic Unleashed (2008).

Music
Face to Faith: Sonic and the Black Knight Vocal Trax is the game's official vocal songs soundtrack that was released on April 8, 2009, in Japan. It features five vocal tracks that were featured in the game, with "Seven Rings in Hand ~Fairytales in Trance~" by Bentley Jones and "With Me ~Massive Power Mix~" by Crush 40 as brand new bonus tracks created especially for the album.

Tales of Knighthood: Sonic and the Black Knight Original Soundtrax is the game's original soundtrack. It was released by Wave Music Entertainment in Japan on April 8, 2009.

Reception

Sonic and the Black Knight was met with mixed reviews from critics. It received a score of 55.19% on GameRankings and 54/100 on Metacritic, indicating "mixed or average reviews". The game entered the Japanese sales chart at 30th place, and the North American Wii charts at tenth. It was de-listed in 2010, following on from Sega's decision to remove all Sonic titles with mixed Metacritic scores from retail stores in order to increase the value of the brand after positive reviews for Sonic the Hedgehog 4: Episode I and Sonic Colors.

IGNs Matt Casamassina praised the game's visuals and the overall presentation, but went on to state that the gameplay was "broken" and cited the controls as "unresponsive". GameDaily criticized the "repetitive combat, easy missions and limited controls keep it from greatness," but acknowledged its "attractive presentation, decent combat and bonus content." Chris Scullion from the UK's Official Nintendo Magazine praised the game's visuals and soundtrack, but criticized the swordplay mechanics and multiplayer element. GameSpot's Carolyn Petit noted that, while the sword is useful slashing through enemies, there is a noticeable delay from the time swinging the Wii Remote and the time Sonic actually swings. 1Up.com's Sam Kennedy gave the game a C+ stating, "Black Knight is a competent action game starring Sonic and friends, but one that's replaced the classic gameplay Sonic fans seek with overly simple swordplay. It'll do the trick just fine for younger players still infatuated with the blue porcupine, but everyone else will likely be just as let down as I was." Videogamer.com gave the game a 5 out of 10 which read, "Even if you accept that the Sonic games aren’t built for hardcore gamers, that they’re now designed to appeal to the mainstream, that’s no reason to accept shoddy gameplay."

Notes

References

External links

Official website

2009 video games
3D platform games
Fantasy video games
Sega video games
Sonic Team games
Video games based on Arthurian legend
Video games scored by Howard Drossin
Video games scored by Jun Senoue
Video games scored by Lennie Moore
Video games scored by Richard Jacques
Video games scored by Tommy Tallarico
Video games about parallel universes
Video games set in castles
Video game sequels
Wii-only games
Wii Wi-Fi games
Multiplayer and single-player video games
Sonic the Hedgehog spin-off games
Video games developed in Japan